The Syrian Computer Society is an organization in Syria. It was founded by Bassel al-Assad in 1989, and was subsequently headed by his brother Bashar al-Assad, who would later become the President of Syria. It acts as Syria's domain name registration authority and has been reported to be closely associated with the Syrian state.

In May 2013, 700 domains registered by Syrians, mostly hosted at servers with IP addresses assigned to the Syrian Computer Society, were reported to have been seized by the U.S. DNS infrastructure operator Network Solutions. The domain names became registered to "OFAC Holding", believed to be a reference to the U.S. federal government's Office of Foreign Assets Control.

Some members of the Syrian Computer Society belonged to the first group of supporters of the Syrian Electronic Army.

References

External links
 

Organizations based in Syria
Organizations established in 1989
Domain name registries
Domain name seizures by United States